Italy women's national goalball team is the women's national team of Italy.  Goalball is a team sport designed specifically for athletes with a vision impairment.  The team takes part in international competitions.

Paralympic Games

1984 New York 

The team competed in the 1984 Summer Paralympics at Long Island, New York City, United States of America, where they finished fifth.

IBSA World Games

2007 São Paulo 

The team competed in the 2007 IBSA World Games, from 28 July 2007 to 8 August 2007, in São Paulo, Brazil.  The women's goalball competition included thirteen teams, including this one.  The competition was a 2008 Summer Paralympics qualifying event.

The team placed eighth.

Goal scoring by competition

Competitive history 
The table below contains individual game results for the team in international matches and competitions.

See also 

 Disabled sports 
 Italy men's national goalball team 
 Italy at the Paralympics

References

Goalball
National women's goalball teams
European national goalball teams